Maria Anna of Savoy (19 September 1803 – 4 May 1884) was Empress of Austria and Queen of Hungary (see Grand title of the Empress of Austria) by marriage to Emperor Ferdinand I of Austria. Born a Princess of Savoy, she was the penultimate child and daughter of King Victor Emmanuel I of Sardinia and his wife, Maria Theresa of Austria-Este.

Biography

Maria Anna was born on 19 September 1803 in Palazzo Colonna in Rome, the daughter of King Victor Emmanuel I of Sardinia and his wife, Archduchess Maria Teresa of Austria-Este. She had a twin sister, Maria Teresa. The two princesses were baptised by Pope Pius VII. Their godparents were their maternal grandparents, Archduke Ferdinand of Austria-Este and his wife Maria Beatrice Ricciarda d'Este. In the Museo di Roma can be seen a painting of the baptism. She was known as "Pia" within the family.

On 12 February 1831 Maria Anna was married by procuration in Turin to King Ferdinand V of Hungary, eldest son and heir apparent of Emperor Francis I of Austria. On 27 February the couple were married in person in Vienna in the Hofburg chapel by the cardinal archbishop of Olmütz. Maria Anna was selected to marry the future emperor at the age of 27, which was very late for a princess to marry in this time period. However, her age was seen as a sign that she would be more settled, religious and easier to manage.

Maria Anna and Ferdinand had no children.

Ferdinand succeeded as emperor of Austria on 2 March 1835; Maria Anna became empress. On 12 September 1836 she was crowned queen of Bohemia in Prague.

Maria Anna never learned to speak German during her tenure as empress, but preferred to speak French. She enjoyed some popularity as empress, and a festival was celebrated on her name day 26 July each year. Minister Metternich managed the Government during the reign of her spouse. Unlike her sister-in-law Sophie of Bavaria, Maria Anna had no influence upon policy. She supported Emperor Ferdinand, who was unable to manage state affairs because of his health, was respected for this, and referred to herself as his nurse.

During the 1848 Revolution, Maria Anna retracted her support from the Metternich Policy with support from Sophie of Bavaria. However, she did voice her opinion that stronger measures should be taken against the revolution.  She influenced her spouse's decision to abdicate.

On 2 December 1848 Ferdinand abdicated, but he and Maria Anna retained their imperial rank. They lived in retirement together, spending the winters at Prague Castle and the summers at Reichstadt (now Zákupy) or at Ploschkowitz (now Ploskovice). Maria Anna was popular in Prague, where she was engaged in local charity.

Maria Anna died in Prague.  She is buried next to her husband in tomb number 63 in the Imperial Crypt in Vienna.

Honours 
  : Dame of the Order of the Starry Cross
  : Dame of the Order of Queen Maria Luisa

Ancestry

Footnotes

Bibliography
 Biographisches Lexikon des Kaiserthums Oesterreich

External links 

Maria Anna of Sardinia
Maria Anna of Sardinia
19th-century Austrian people
19th-century Austrian women
Austrian empresses
Hungarian queens consort
Bohemian queens consort
Lombardic queens consort
Princesses of Savoy
Burials at the Imperial Crypt
Italian twins
House of Habsburg-Lorraine
Nobility from Rome
Ferdinand I of Austria
Daughters of kings